Grand Alliance may refer to:

 Grand Alliance (1815), an alternative name for the Holy Alliance founded by Tsar Alexander I of Russia
 Grand Alliance (Bangladesh), a coalition government in Bangladesh
 Grand Alliance (1971), a coalition of opposition political parties in India during the 1971 Indian general election. 
 Grand Alliance (HDTV), the consortium of companies developing the American HDTV standard
 Grand Alliance (League of Augsburg), a coalition of European nations in the 17th and 18th century
 Second Grand Alliance, a re-formation of the League of Augsburg; see Treaty of The Hague (1701)
 Grand Alliance (Philippines), a historical political coalition in the Philippines led by the Progressive Party
 Grand Alliance (World War II), an alliance of the US, UK, and Soviet Union against Nazi Germany during World War II
 Grand Alliance for Democracy, a coalition of political parties in the Philippines, led by the Nacionalista Party
 Grand Alliance Party, a political party in Sierra Leone
 The Grand Alliance, the third volume of Winston Churchill's The Second World War
 Grand Allies, coal cartel in north-east England, also known as the Grand Alliance

See also
Great Alliance for Change, a 1998 political party alliance in Colombia